"Bless" is the thirty-seventh single by L'Arc-en-Ciel, released on January 27, 2010. It was used as the theme song to the NHK broadcast of the 2010 Vancouver Olympics. "Bless" reached number 2 on the Oricon singles chart, selling 80,859 copies during the first week.

Track listing

References

 http://www.sonymusic.co.jp/Music/Arch/KS/LArc-en-Ciel/KSCL-1550/index.html

2010 singles
L'Arc-en-Ciel songs
Songs written by Hyde (musician)
2010 songs
Ki/oon Music singles